The Parish of Santa Clara is a church in the city of Puebla's historic centre, in the Mexican state of Puebla.

References

External links

 

Roman Catholic churches in Puebla (city)
Historic centre of Puebla